Wunderkind Little Amadeus, commonly referred to as Little Amadeus, is a German historical television series (known as Die Abenteuer des jungen Mozart – "The Adventures of Young Mozart") is a German TV series produced by ARD and KiKa that debuted in 2006. The show was licensed by American Public Television in 2008 for distribution to public television stations in the United States. It helps a young Wolfgang Amadeus Mozart feature a soundtrack with the musical works of the composer. The series originally aired on KiKa in Germany.

Cast

Episodes

References

External links 
 
 Little Amadeus homepage
 Little Amadeus at KiKA 

2006 German television series debuts
2006 German television series endings
2000s animated television series
Animated television series about children
Children's education television series
German children's animated television series
Wolfgang Amadeus Mozart in fiction
Television shows set in Austria
Television series set in the 18th century
Animation based on real people
PBS Kids shows